Pseudodaphnella excellens is a species of sea snail, a marine gastropod mollusk in the family Raphitomidae.

Description
The length of the shell attains 14 mm.

A small shell of a striking ovate-turreted character with six whorls. The colour of the shell is white, but the nodules on the eight ribs are quite prominent, mostly of a pale yellow colour, but here and there they are ornamented with conspicuous bright brown blotches, sparingly distributed. The aperture is oblong and narrow. The outer lip is thick and denticulate within. The posterior sinus is slightly deep and has a rounded curvature. The columella is upright, turning slightly to the left. The short siphonal canal is anteriorly expanded.

Distribution
This marine species occurs off Japan and Taiwan, the Cook Islands, Society Islands, Fiji Islands and New Caledonia.

References

External links
 Kilburn, R. N. (2009). Genus Kermia (Mollusca: Gastropoda: Conoidea: Conidae: Raphitominae) in South African Waters, with Observations on the Identities of Related Extralimital Species. African Invertebrates''. 50(2): 217–236
 Fedosov A. E. & Puillandre N. (2012) Phylogeny and taxonomy of the Kermia–Pseudodaphnella (Mollusca: Gastropoda: Raphitomidae) genus complex: a remarkable radiation via diversification of larval development. Systematics and Biodiversity 10(4): 447–477
 
 Gastropods.com: Pseudodaphnella excellens

excellens
Gastropods described in 1913